The Jack and Laura Dangermond Preserve is a nature reserve in Santa Barbara County California managed by The Nature Conservancy. The land is host to a variety of wildlife species, as it touches two major terrestrial and two major marine biomes. Animals from both southern and northern California mix territories in this area.

Location 
It is adjacent to protected marine areas. The land touches the south and east sides of Jalama Beach County Park.

History 
The preserve was created in 2017 by a donation from Jack and Laura Dangermond. The $165 million donation to The Nature Conservancy to secure the land was the largest the organization has ever received.

The reserve was included in the Prescribed Fire Training Exchange (TREX)  held November 12-19, 2022 with a controlled fire by firefighters to clear away dead undergrowth and other debris. The training on how to safely conduct prescribed burns, seminars on local fire ecology, and tribal burning included Santa Barbara County Fire Department, employees of the Santa Ynez Band of Chumash Indians, The Nature Conservancy, University of California Agriculture and Natural Resources, Vandenberg Space Force Base, scientists, ranchers, students, researchers, and land managers.

See also 
California montane chaparral and woodlands
Flora of the Transverse Ranges
List of beaches in California
List of California state parks

References

External links
 Jack and Laura Dangermond Preserve Maps

Nature reserves in California
2017 establishments in California
Nature Conservancy preserves
Protected areas of Santa Barbara County, California
Protected areas established in 2017